The 2019 Gold Coast Titans season is the 13th in the club's history. They competed in the National Rugby League's 2019 Telstra Premiership. The start of season Captain, Ryan James ended his season and in-turn his captaincy due to an ACL rupture in April 2019, this brought forward a well-performing Tyrone Roberts to be selected as the team's captain for the rest of the 2019 NRL Season. The start of the year Head Coach Garth Brennan was axed in mid-July due to a "the results the club has achieved on the field this season have not met expectations", from the same weekend until the end of the season  assistants Craig Hodges and Luke Burt took over as interim coaches. In late-July Gold Coast Titans confirmed a 2020 NRL Season coach after the recent dramas.

The 2019 NRL Season the titans came 16th place, this turns out to be the worst performance of the team since it's 16th placing in the 2011 NRL season.

Player Movement
These movements happened across the previous season, off-season and pre-season.

Gains

Losses

Pre-Season Challenge

Regular Season

2019 Squad

Statistics

References

 Gold Coast Titans seasons
Gold Coast Titans season
2019 NRL Women's season